Tocqueville-sur-Eu is a former commune in the Seine-Maritime department in the Normandy region in northern France. On 1 January 2016, it was merged into the new commune of Petit-Caux.

Geography
Here, huge chalk cliffs rise up from the pebble beach.

Population

Places of interest
 Trinity church, with vestiges dating from the twelfth century.

See also
Communes of the Seine-Maritime department

References

Former communes of Seine-Maritime